Ricinoleic acid, formally called 12-hydroxy-9-cis-octadecenoic acid is a fatty acid.  It is an unsaturated omega-9 fatty acid and a hydroxy acid. It is a major component of the seed oil obtained from castor plant (Ricinus communis L., Euphorbiaceae) seeds and is also found in the sclerotium of ergot (Claviceps purpurea Tul., Clavicipitaceae). About 90% of the fatty acid content in castor oil is the triglyceride formed from ricinoleic acid.

Production
Ricinoleic acid is manufactured for industries by saponification or fractional distillation of hydrolyzed castor oil. 

The first attempts to prepare ricinoleic acid were made by Friedrich Krafft in 1888.

Use
Sebacic acid ((CH2)8(CO2H)2), which is used in preparing certain nylons, is produced by cleavage of ricinoleic acid. The coproduct is 2-octanol.  The mechanism of the base-induced cleavage is proposed to proceed by initial dehydrogenation of the secondary alcohol, affording the ketone.  The resulting α,β-unsaturated ketone undergoes retroaldol reaction, resulting in lysis of the C-C bond.

The zinc salt is used in personal care products such as deodorants.

Biological activities
Ricinoleic acid exerts analgesic and anti-inflammatory effects.

Ricinoleic acid specifically activates the EP3 prostanoid receptor for prostaglandin E2. This is the mechanism responsible for the laxative and labor-inducing effects of castor oil.

Ricinoleic acid acts as a specific algicide for the control of cyanobacteria (formerly called blue-green algae).

See also
 Castor oil
 Lesquerolic acid, a similar chemical, which could be described as ricinoleic acid with -CH2-CH2- group inserted between carboxyl group and the double bound.
 Polyglycerol polyricinoleate, a polymer of glycerol with ricinoleic acid side chains, used as an emulsifier in chocolate
 Ricinelaidic acid, the trans isomer of ricinoleic acid
 Ricinolein, the triglyceride of ricinoleic acid
 Sodium ricinoleate, the sodium salt of ricinoleic acid
 Undecylenic acid, a product of pyrolysis of ricinoleic acid

References

Fatty acids
Hydroxy acids
Castor oil plant